Grylloblatta marmoreus is a species of cave-dwelling insect in the family Grylloblattidae. Its type locality is in the Marble Mountains of California, United States.

Entomology
G.marmoreus was described from a male found on a rock in Planetary Dairy Cave , and a juvenile in a pit. The male specimen is 125mm long, and buff, while the juvenile is amber.

References

Grylloblattidae
Cave insects
Insects described in 2012